Fabien Leclercq (born 19 October 1972 in Lille, France) is a French football player. He currently plays at Gap FC.

External links

1972 births
Living people
Footballers from Lille
French footballers
France under-21 international footballers
French expatriate footballers
Lille OSC players
Heart of Midlothian F.C. players
AS Cannes players
ASOA Valence players
FC Sète 34 players
Ligue 1 players
Ligue 2 players
Scottish Premier League players
Expatriate footballers in Scotland
Association football defenders
Competitors at the 1993 Mediterranean Games
Mediterranean Games bronze medalists for France
Mediterranean Games medalists in football